The 11703/11704 Rewa–Dr. Ambedkar Nagar Express is a tri-weekly Express train service connecting  of Indore, the largest city and commercial hub of Central Indian state Madhya Pradesh and , a major city in Madhya Pradesh, India. Train was announced in Railway Budget 2012–13 and the train was flagged off on 5 March 2013 from Indore Junction.

In July 2017, the service of the train was extended up to Dr. Ambedkar Nagar on tri-weekly basis.

Coach Composition

The train consists of 21 coaches:

 1 AC First Class
 1 AC II Tier
 1 AC III Tier
 10 Sleeper Class
 6 General Unreserved
 2 Seating cum Luggage Rake

Service

The 11703/Rewa–Dr. Ambedkar Nagar Express has an average speed of 49 km/hr and covers 831 km in 16 hrs 50 mins.

The 11704/Dr. Ambedkar Nagar–Rewa Express has an average speed of 52 km/hr and covers 831 km in 15 hrs 55 mins.

Routes and halts

The important halts of the train are:

Schedule

Direction reversal

Train reverses its direction 1 times at:

Traction

Both trains are hauled by a Katni Loco Shed-based WDM-3A diesel locomotive from Rewa to Katni after which an Itarsi Loco Shed-based WAP-4 electric locomotive haul the train for the remainder of its journey until Mhow and vice versa.

See also

 Bhopal–Jodhpur Express
 Jabalpur–Jodhpur Express
 Indore–Guwahati Weekly Express

References

Notes

External links
 http://www.indianrailways.gov.in/railwayboard/uploads/directorate/coaching/pdf/43.pdf
 http://www.indianrailways.gov.in/railwayboard/uploads/directorate/coaching/pdf/43A.pdf
 11703/Rewa - Mhow Express
 11704/Mhow - Rewa express

Express trains in India
Rail transport in Madhya Pradesh
Transport in Mhow
Transport in Rewa, Madhya Pradesh